Deville, DeVille, De Ville, or de Vil may refer to:

Automobiles
 Cadillac DeVille, model of automobile produced between 1949 and 2005 in the United States by General Motors
 Coupé de Ville, European term for the "town car" body style
 Statesman de Ville, model of automobile produced between 1971 and 1984 in Australia by General Motors

People
 Abigail DeVille,
 Brandon Deville,
 C.C. DeVille (born 1962), lead guitarist for American glam metal band Poison
 Céline Deville,
 Charles Joseph Sainte-Claire Deville (1814–1876), French geologist
 Cherie Deville (born 1978), American pornographic actress
 Cristian Deville,
 Cruella de Ville, 1980s punk rock band
 Édouard-Gaston Deville (1849–1924), French inventor, surveyor, astronomer
 Émile Deville,
 Frank Deville,
 Gabriel Deville (1854–1940), French politician
 Henri Étienne Sainte-Claire Deville (1818–1881), French chemist
 Julia deVille,
 Maurice Deville,
 Michel Deville (born 1931), French film director
 Patrick Deville,
 Philippe DeVille (born 1944), Belgian economist 
 Scoop DeVille,
 Sonya Deville,
 Stephanie Devillé,
 Toots Deville,
 Willy DeVille, musician
 Mink DeVille, rock band led by Willy DeVille

Fictional characters
 Cruella de Vil, the main villainess from the book The Hundred and One Dalmatians and movie One Hundred and One Dalmatians
 Betty DeVille, Howard DeVille, Phil and Lil DeVille, from the Nickelodeon TV series Rugrats and All Grown Up!
 Count de Ville is a title used by the vampire Dracula in the novel of the same name.

Places
 Deville, Ardennes, commune of the Ardennes in France
 Deville, Louisiana, census-designated place in the United States

Other uses
 Jaxson de Ville, American football mascot
 Kip Deville, thoroughbred race horse who won the 2007 Breeders' Cup Mile

See also
 Ville (disambiguation)
French toponymic surnames